Turnu Roșu is a commune located in Sibiu County, Transylvania, Romania. It is composed of two villages, Sebeșu de Jos (Unterschewesch; Oltalsósebes), and Turnu Roșu.

References

Communes in Sibiu County
Localities in Transylvania